Habenaria rhodocheila is a species of orchid that occurs from South China to peninsular Malaysia and the Philippines.

References

rhodocheila
Orchids of China
Orchids of Malaysia
Orchids of the Philippines